1st Louisiana Native Guard may refer to:

1st Louisiana Native Guard (CSA), Confederate militia unit disbanded early in the American Civil War.
1st Louisiana Native Guard (United States), infantry unit of the Union or United States Army during the American Civil War.